James Alefantis is an American chef and restaurateur. He founded and owns two restaurants in Washington, D.C., including the pizzeria Comet Ping Pong, and American restaurant Buck's Fishing & Camping. He is also the president of the art gallery Transformer in Logan Circle, Washington, D.C. In 2012, GQ named him one of the 50 most powerful people in Washington, D.C.

Biography
Alefantis was raised in Buffalo, New York and Washington, D.C. Prior to becoming a restaurateur, he owned a small art gallery in Georgetown, Virginia, and served as the general manager of Johnny's Half Shell for two years. He founded Buck's Fishing & Camping in October 2003 along with Carole Greenwood. Originally, the restaurant was called "Greenwood", and she was the restaurant's chef and he was its owner. Alefantis has said that he and Greenwood collaborated on every item on the menu at Buck's. In 2006, he and Greenwood co-founded Comet Ping Pong, and in 2009 after Greenwood stepped away for the businesses Alefantis hired Vickie Reh to be chef at Bucks and Laura Bonino to be head chef at Comet Pizza . Alafantis is also a partner in Muchas Gracias, a Mexican restaurant in Washington, DC.

Personal life
Alefantis is openly gay. He formerly dated David Brock, the CEO of Media Matters for America.

References

American restaurateurs
Living people
Businesspeople from Washington, D.C.
American LGBT businesspeople
Businesspeople from Buffalo, New York
Place of birth missing (living people)
Year of birth missing (living people)
Gay businessmen